Pyrausta louvinia is a moth in the family Crambidae. It is found on the Juan Fernández Islands.

References

Moths described in 1965
louvinia
Moths of South America